Wilfred Lewis Warren (24 August 1929 – 19 July 1994) was an historian of medieval England. Educated at Exeter College, Oxford, he worked as a professor of modern (post-classical) history and dean of theology at the Queen's University, Belfast. His field of interest was Norman and Angevin England, on which he published several major works.
In 1956 he received a doctorate in 14th-century English church history. He was fascinated by and well versed in Ulster politics.

Select publications

References

Further reading

1929 births
1994 deaths
People from Tunstall, Staffordshire
Alumni of Exeter College, Oxford
Academics of Queen's University Belfast
British medievalists
20th-century British historians